Billardiera fraseri (the elegant pronaya) is a species of plant in the family, Pittosporaceae, which is endemic to Western Australia.

Description
B. fraseri like other members of the genus, Billardiera, is a woody climber with alternate leaves.

Taxonomy
This plant was first described by Hooker in 1836  as Spiranthera fraseri, and revised by Mueller in 1862 as belonging to the genus, Billardiera.

Earliest collected specimen in an Australian herbarium is MEL 0065042A, which was collected by J.A.L. Preiss on the Swan Coastal Plain, in forested sand dunes near Perth on 20 January 1840.

See also 
 List of Australian plant species authored by Ferdinand von Mueller

References

External links 
 
 Bennett, E.M. 1972. 
 Bennett, E.M. 1978. 
 
 Billardiera fraseri at The Plant List
 Billardiera fraseri at Tropicos

fraseri
Plants described in 1862
Taxa named by William Jackson Hooker
Endemic flora of Southwest Australia